The Greatest Part is the second studio album by American indie folk musician Becca Mancari. It was released on June 26, 2020, by Captured Tracks.

Release
On April 7, 2020, Mancari released the first single "Hunter". The single was produced by Paramore drummer Zac Farro.

On May 6, 2020, Mancari announced the release of her second studio album, along with the second single from the album "First Time".

The third single "Lonely Boy" was released on June 9, 2020.

Mancari released the video clip to "Tear Us Apart" on July 9, 2020.

Critical reception
Marcy Donelson of AllMusic wrote "The Greatest Part pretty seamlessly shifts the balance away from more folk-leaning elements toward keyboards and catchier choruses without losing the warm, dreamy quality of her sound. Having entered recording sessions with the goal of making "sad pop music," Mancari effectively accomplishes that aim on an album that keeps its melodies, rhythms, and the palette bright and welcoming." Writing for Consequence of Sound, Jennifer Irving wrote: "The Greatest Part earns its place as a second record that is a definitive step forward, specifically musically. It’s a fantastic album to lay around the house and do nothing while listening, and yet it’s no stranger to provoking thoughtful conversations with its lyrical content. Although the energy at the beginning of the album stands tallest, Mancari’s more stripped-down tracks towards the end showcase her proficiency in crafting different sounds."

Accolades

Track listing

Personnel

Musicians
 Becca Mancari – primary artist
 Julien Baker – backing vocals
 Zac Farro – guitar, bass, drums, producer
 Juan Solorzano – guitar
 Joey Howard – bass
 Adam Schatz – keyboard
 Benjamin Kaufman – strings

Production
 Dave Cooley – mastering
 Carlos de la Garza – mixing

References

2020 albums
Captured Tracks albums